Shane Dix (born 1960 in Wales) is an Australian science fiction author best known for his collaborative work with Sean Williams in the Star Wars: New Jedi Order series.

In addition to his novels with Sean Williams, Dix has had short stories published in various magazines and anthologies, including Aurealis: Australian Fantasy & Science Fiction,  Eidolon: The Journal of Australian Science Fiction and Fantasy, Borderlands, Twenty3 : A Miscellany (1998), and Alien Shores: An Anthology of Australian Science Fiction (1994).

While primarily known for his science-fiction work, since 2007 Dix has been branching out into other genres and fields of writing with a number of original novels.  Four of these manuscripts are now complete, and he is currently looking for an agent to represent them.

His daughter Katelin Dix is also a writer, with promising work in both teenage and fantasy fiction.

Bibliography

Series Contributions 
Cogal Series  (co-written with Sean Williams)
 The Unknown Soldier (1995)

Evergence Series (co-written with Sean Williams)
 The Prodigal Sun (1999)
 The Dying Light (2000)
 The Dark Imbalance (2001)

Orphans (co-written with Sean Williams)
 Echoes of Earth (2002)
 Orphans of Earth (2002)
 Heirs of Earth (2003)

Star Wars: The New Jedi Order (co-written with Sean Williams)
 Force Heretic I: Remnant (2003)
 Force Heretic II: Refugee (2003)
 Force Heretic III: Reunion(2003)
 Or Die Trying (2004 short story co-written with Sean Williams)

Novels 
 Geodesica: Ascent (February 2005) (co-written with Sean Williams)
 Geodesica: Descent (February 2006) (co-written with Sean Williams)

Awards
 1995 nominated for Aurealis Award for Best Science Fiction Novel for The Unknown Soldier
 1996 nominated for Ditmar Award for Best Long Fiction for The Unknown Soldier
 2000 nominated for Aurealis Award for Best Science Fiction Novel for The Dying Light 
 2001 winner of Aurealis Award for Best Science Fiction Novel for The Dark Imbalance 
 2001 winner of Ditmar Award for Best Long Fiction for The Dying Light
 2002 nominated for Aurealis Award for Best Science Fiction Novel for Echoes of Earth
 2003 nominated for Aurealis Award for Best Science Fiction Novel for Orphans of Earth 
 2003 winner of Ditmar Award for Best Australian Novel for Echoes of Earth
 2004 nominated for Aurealis Award for Best Science Fiction Novel for Heirs of Earth
 2004 nominated for Ditmar Award for Best Novel for Orphans of Earth 
 2005 nominated for Aurealis Award for Best Science Fiction Novel for Ascent
 2006 nominated for Aurealis Award for Best Science Fiction Novel for Descent
 2006 winner of Ditmar Award for Best Novel for Ascent

Biography
 Space Invader by Susie O'Brien, The Advertiser 25 March 2000

Interviews
 A Conversation with Sean Williams and Shane Dix with Lisa DuMond, The SF Site, January 2002 
 Andromeda Spaceways Inflight Magazine no. 23, 2006, pp 107–111

External links
Fantastic Fiction Entry on Shane Dix

References

Australian science fiction writers
Living people
1960 births